The Heart of Illinois Conference is a Central Illinois based high school athletic conference in the Illinois High School Association (IHSA).

History
The conference was formed in 2006 from members of the Mid State and Sangamon Valley conferences. Eureka High School joined the conference in 2016 from the Corn Belt Conference. The conference is divided into large and small divisions with Eureka, El Paso-Gridley, Fieldcrest, Deer Creek Mackinaw, Tri-Valley, and Ridgeview composing the large division and GCMS, Tremont, Heyworth, Le Roy, Fisher, and Flanagan-Cornell composing the small division. Blue Ridge was a part of the Small Division until 2018, when it left for the Little Okaw Valley Conference in 2018.

Member schools

Former Members

References

External links

Illinois high school sports conferences
Education in McLean County, Illinois